Tick Ridge is an unincorporated community in Washington County, in the U.S. state of Ohio.

History
Tick Ridge most likely was so named on account of the frequent wood ticks there.

References

Unincorporated communities in Washington County, Ohio
Unincorporated communities in Ohio